Syracuse Orange is the NCAA college soccer team for Syracuse University in Syracuse, New York. They are a Division I team in the Atlantic Coast Conference.

Syracuse fielded its first varsity soccer team in 1920.  The program rose to national prominence early in its history, being recognized by the Intercollegiate Soccer Football Association as national champions for 1936. Syracuse competed with the other northeastern soccer programs as an independent until 1979. The University was a founding member of the Big East Conference in 1979 and the Orange broke new ground in 1982 when they finished with a record of 17-3-2 and won the inaugural BIG EAST Tournament by beating Boston College in the final. On July 1, 2013, Syracuse joined the Atlantic Coast Conference (ACC).

Syracuse is currently coached by Ian McIntyre who has brought the team to the  National Championship, two NCAA Tournament College Cup, and two ACC Conference Titles in 2015 and 2022. McIntyre was named the National College Coach of the Year in 2022, the ACC Coach of the Year in 2014 and 2022, and the Big East Coach of the Year in 2012.

The Orange won the National Championship in the 2022 NCAA Division I men's soccer tournament, defeating eight time NCAA Champions Indiana 7-6 on Penalty Kicks.

Roster

Orange in the MLS

MLS Draft HIstory

Generation Adidas Players

Championships

2022 College Cup 
2022 NCAA soccer season was the most successful in the history of the Orange program. Syracuse achieved a Treble by winning ACC Conference regular season, ACC Conference tournament, and NCAA National Championships.

2015 College Cup

2022 ACC Conference Champions

2015 ACC Conference Champions

Big East Conference Champions 

The Orange soccer program competed in the Big East Conference since its first season of existence until the Orange joined to play in the Atlantic Coast Conference in 2013.

Individual award winners

MAC Hermann Trophy

All-Americans

The 30-Goal Club

Notable alumni

 Alex Bono, goalkeeper for Toronto FC of Major League Soccer
 Miles Robinson, defender for Atlanta United of Major League Soccer
 Tajon Buchanan, forward for Club Brugge KV of Belgian Pro League
 Kamal Miller, defender for CF Montreal of Major League Soccer
 Patrice Bernier, retired midfielder for Montreal Impact of Major League Soccer
 Julian Büscher, former midfielder for D.C. United of Major League Soccer
 Ben Polk, former forward for Portland Timbers of Major League Soccer
 Mo Adams, midfielder for Chicago Fire of Major League Soccer
 Chris Nanco, forward drafted 55th overall in 2017 MLS SuperDraft by the Philadelphia Union
 Korab Syla, retired midfielder
 Sergio Camargo, former midfielder signed to Toronto FC of Major League Soccer
 Øyvind Alseth, former defender/midfielder for Toronto FC of Major League Soccer
 Joe Papaleo, retired goalkeeper who went on to play in the Major Indoor Soccer League 
 Skylar Thomas, defender drafted 11th overall in 2015 MLS SuperDraft by Toronto FC
 Jordan Murrell, defender selected 57th overall in 2015 MLS SuperDraft by Real Salt Lake
 Nicolás Perea, midfielder for Rio Grande Valley FC Toros of the United Soccer League
 Chris Aloisi, retired Major League Soccer defenseman
 Nick Bibbs, defender who last played for Bethlehem Steel FC of the United Soccer League
 Gary Anderson (placekicker), retired NFL placekicker who played for 23 seasons
 Jeremy Vuolo, retired New York Red Bulls goalkeeper and reality star known for marriage to Jinger Duggar
 John McEwan (soccer), member of United States men's national soccer team in 1937

Footnotes

References

External links

 

 
Association football clubs established in 1920
Men's soccer clubs in New York (state)
1920 establishments in New York (state)